There are at least 429 named trails in Wyoming according to the U.S. Geological Survey, Board of Geographic Names.  A trail is defined as: "Route for passage from one point to another; does not include roads or highways (jeep trail, path, ski trail)."

 Albany County, Wyoming
Brady Rock Trail, el.  
 Buford Trail, el.  
 Circle Trail, el.  
 Horse Creek Trail, el.  
 Lakes Trail, el.  
 Lincoln Trail, el.  
 Overland Trail, el.  
 Overland Trail, el.  
 Pole Mountain Trail, el.  
 Ridge Camp Trail, el.  
 Big Horn County, Wyoming
 List of trails in Big Horn County, Wyoming
 Carbon County, Wyoming
 List of trails in Carbon County, Wyoming
 Crook County, Wyoming
 Geis Trail, el.  
 Lanning Trail, el.  
 Nilson Trail, el.  
 Rauth Trail, el.  
 Simmons Trail, el.  
 Table Mountain Trail, el.  
 Fremont County, Wyoming
 List of trails in Fremont County, Wyoming
 Hot Springs County, Wyoming
 Rock Creek Trail, el.  
 Wind River Trail, el.  
 Wind River Trail, el.  
 Johnson County, Wyoming
 Angeline Trail, el.  
 Bozeman Trail, el.  
 Cash Trail, el.  
 Penrose Park Trail, el.  
 Laramie County, Wyoming
 Lattas Ranch Trail, el.  
 Lincoln County, Wyoming
 Emigrant Trail, el.  
 Oregon Trail - Lander Cutoff, el.  
 Pine Creek Trail, el.  
 Smiths Fork Greys River Stock Driveway, el.  
 Stewart Trail, el.  
 Wyoming Range Trail, el.  
 Natrona County, Wyoming
 Bates Hole Stock Trail, el.  
 E-k Trail, el.  
 Okie Trail, el.  
 Park County, Wyoming
 List of trails in Park County, Wyoming
 Sheridan County, Wyoming
 Bear Gulch Trail, el.  
 Dry Fork Trail, el.  
 Dry Fork Trail, el.  
 Game Creek Trail, el.  
 Little Horn Trail, el.  
 Roosevelt Trail, el.  
 Stockwell Trail, el.  
 Story Penrose Trail, el.  
 Tepee Trail, el.  
 Wolf Creek Trail, el.  

 Sublette County, Wyoming
 List of trails in Sublette County, Wyoming
 Sweetwater County, Wyoming
 Canyon Road Trail, el.  
 Emigrant Trail, el.  
 Emigrant Trail, el.  
 Emigrant Trail, el.  
 Overland Trail, el.  
 Teton County, Wyoming
 List of trails in Teton County, Wyoming
 Uinta County, Wyoming
 Emigrant Trail, el.  
 Emigrant Trail, el.  
 Emigrant Trail, el.  
 Emigrant Trail, el.  
 Emigrant Trail, el.

Further reading

See also
 List of trails of Montana
 Emigrant Trail in Wyoming
 Trails of Yellowstone National Park

Notes

Historic trails and roads in Wyoming